Coleman A. Young International Airport  (Coleman A. Young Municipal Airport, formerly Detroit City Airport until 2003) is six miles northeast of downtown Detroit, in Wayne County, Michigan. It is owned by the City of Detroit. The Federal Aviation Administration (FAA) National Plan of Integrated Airport Systems for 2017–2021 categorized it as a regional general aviation facility. In 2003, it was given its current name in honor of the late former mayor of Detroit.

From July 1988 through September 1993, Southwest Airlines served the airport with 10 to 13 daily flights. Chautauqua Airlines served the airport but ceased service less than a year later. Spirit Airlines planned to fly McDonnell-Douglas DC-9s to DET in 1995, but never began service. Pro Air, a scheduled passenger airline, was based at the airport and grounded by the FAA due to poor maintenance performance after less than a year. The airport now has no scheduled passenger airline service.

The airport's passenger terminal also houses facilities for Customs and Border Protection, which serves private and cargo airplanes.

The  passenger terminal includes space for restaurants, retail concessions, car rental facilities, airline offices, baggage pick-up and claim areas, boarding areas and passenger lounges. The airport has three 1,000 space parking lots.

The city of Detroit says that the facility has staff and is operational. It is listed as an asset of the city, but its future plans are in doubt.

Former airline service (1966-2000)
The following airlines served Detroit City Airport:
Wright Airlines (1966–1985)
Northwest Airlink (1985–1988)
Comair (1987–1991)
Southwest Airlines (1988–1993)
Direct Air (1988–1990)
Northcoast Executive Airlines (1988–1990)
Continental Express (1988–1991)
Central State Airlines (1989–1990)
Air Alpha (1991)
USAir Express (1993–1994)
Pro Air (1997–2000)

DET was Detroit's primary airport until 1946-47 when almost all airline flights moved to Willow Run Airport and later to Detroit Metropolitan Wayne County Airport. The March 1939 Official Aviation Guide shows 13 weekday departures on American, 10 on Pennsylvania Central and one on Marquette. The June 1946 OAG shows 100 weekday departures on Pennsylvania Central, American, United, Northwest, Eastern, TWA, C&S and Michigan Central.

History 
In 1989 Mayor Coleman A. Young abandoned a plan to expand the airport's runway because the adjoining Gethsemane Cemetery blocked the way, and surviving relatives protested. A few years later Southwest Airlines ended operations there, citing the city's inability to keep its promises and the need for longer runways to allow for larger jets. in 1988, complaints were registered because the city removed/discarded several families' memorial statuary without notification, replacing them with simple flat in-ground markers, stating that the statues posed a collision risk should an airplane go off the end of the runway.

The city closed the segment of East McNichols (6 Mile) Road between Conner Street and French Road at the north end of the airport and annexed the land to the airport, allowing for expansion of the approach to Runway 15 and additional service roads. Satellite photos still show some ruins of the original roadbed and a driveway to a motel and topless bar that occupied the south side of McNichols near Conner. A tunneling project could in the future restore the severed East McNichols Road connection and allow an additional  of the main runway to be used for aviation.

The City of Detroit listed the airport as an asset which could be sold to cover debts as a result of the city's 2013 bankruptcy filing. The future of the site as a functioning airport after any sale would have been uncertain. Ultimately, no sale occurred.

In light of a resurgence of the Detroit's finances in the 2010s, the city council with its airport task force started looking at options for investing into the facility's future. Contributing to the Airport Redevelopment and Modernization Program were consulting companies Avion Solutions and Kimley-Horn, and included were officials of the Michigan Department of Transportation and the Federal Aviation Administration.

The airport is envisioned to serve general aviation, while parts of the land currently used by aviation facilities are to be redeveloped. The main runway 15/33 could be lengthened and the supporting structures modernized. There is a proposal to close and remove the shorter runway 7/25. This could limit the options to conduct training flights, relevant in light of plans to locate the Davis Technical Aerospace High School and other educational and commercial users on the airport grounds. Removing the runway could free up 86 acres for industrial development, abetted by its position close to Conrail's railway line. In return, the airport property could be expanded by 196 acres to the west.

In October 2022, the airport had an Airport Layout Plan for the first time in 30 years, making it eligible to receive over $100 million in federal grants over 10 years. This could allow for the addition of hew hangers, building a control tower, and improving taxiways. There's also the possibility to improve the airport's safety zones, including the potential addition of Engineered Material Arresting System (EMAS). This allowed the airport to resume talks with nearby homeowners to acquire additional land to expand the airport.

Facilities and aircraft

For the 12-month period ending December 31, 2021, the airport had 32,850 aircraft operations, an average of 90 per day: 96% general aviation, 3% air taxi, <1% commercial, and 1% military. 65 aircraft were then based at the airport: 47 single-engine and 7 multi-engine airplanes as well as 5 jets, 5 helicopters, and 1 ultralight.

Since 1994, the city has been working on clearing a federally mandated safety buffer of at least  from the airport's main runway by incrementally buying adjacent land.

Fire protection is provided by the municipal Detroit Fire Department. Budget cuts in 2012 closed Engine Company 20, previously equipped with at least one aircraft rescue and firefighting vehicle, leaving the airport fire station unstaffed. In 2018, it was reported that plans were underway to staff the station for one 8-hour shift each day. In 2020, a construction brief published by the city outlined the work necessary to rehabilitate the fire station building.

The airport has a 1929 aircraft hangar that was designed by Architect Albert Kahn.

Accidents and incidents
On June 24, 2018, a small plane crashed en route to Young. It impacted power lines and a tree. The pilot and one passenger were killed, and a third was rescued.
On December 3, 2019, a British Aerospace BAe-125-800A business jet slid off the runway during landing at the airport. The aircraft was arriving from a flight from Willow Run. Investigators found the aircraft encountered icing conditions on approach and failed to add the necessary safety margins to their airspeed to prevent stall. It was also found the aircraft's stick shaker, a system designed to warn pilots of impending stall, failed to activate. Thus, with the low speed and inadequate warnings, the aircraft stalled close to the runway. The two pilots on board were not injured.
On February 18, 2022, an Embraer Phenom 100 suffered a runway excursion after landing. The aircraft struck airport lighting equipment. The sole pilot on board was not injured. The probable cause was found to be the pilot's decision to land on a contaminated runway with previous reports of unfavorable braking action.

See also 

 Coleman A. Young, former mayor of Detroit, and airport's namesake
 Detroit Metropolitan Wayne County Airport, the larger international airport and currently the primary passenger airport in the Detroit area
Willow Run Airport, the major Detroit airport from 1947 until the early 60s, when flights switched to Metro Airport
Oakland County International Airport, a major general aviation and business airport in neighboring Oakland County
Windsor International Airport, a commercial airport on the Canadian side of the Detroit River
Toledo Express Airport, a commercial airport in Toledo, Ohio, approximately 82 miles southwest of DET

References

External links 
Coleman A. Young International Airport website
 Aerial photo as of 28 March 1999 from USGS The National Map
 
 

Airports in Wayne County, Michigan
Economy of Detroit
Defunct airports in Michigan